Latrell is a given name. Notable people with the name include:

Latrell Mitchell (born 1997), Australian rugby league footballer
Latrell Scott (born 1975), American football coach
Latrell Sprewell (born 1970), American basketball player

See also
Laurell